Spodnji Razbor is a dispersed settlement in the City Municipality of Slovenj Gradec in northern Slovenia. The area is part of the traditional region of Styria. The entire municipality is now included in the Carinthia Statistical Region.

References

External links
Spodnji Razbor at Geopedia

Populated places in the City Municipality of Slovenj Gradec
Slovenj Gradec